Zardab District is one of the 66 districts of Azerbaijan. It is located in the centre of the country and belongs to the Central Aran Economic Region. The district borders the districts of Agdash, Ujar, Kurdamir, Imishli, Beylagan, Aghjabadi, and Barda. Its capital and largest city is Zardab. As of 2020, the district had a population of 59,300.

Overview 
The regional name Zardab is mentioned in historical publication dating back to the 16th century. As a raion, Zardab was established on February 5, 1935. Located in central Azerbaijan, the raion is 231 km to the west of the capital Baku. It is a part of the larger Arran economic region which also includes Agjabadi, Agdash, Beylagan, Barda, Bilasuvar, Goychay, Hajigabul, Imishli, Kurdamir, Neftchala, Saatli, Sabirabad, Salyan, Ujar raions. The raion lies in a lowland area, in some areas below sea level. The area is 860 km3. Zardab constitutes about 1% of the country and 4% of the Arran economic area.

Weather 
The winters in Zardab are mild while the summers are hot with dry subtropic conditions. The temperature reaches 41-44 °C in the summer and +3 °C in the winter. Annual rainfall is 335 mm.

Population 
According to the State Statistics Committee, as of 2018, the population of city recorded 58,200 persons, which increased by 11,600 persons (about 19.9 percent) from 46,600 persons in 2000. 29,500 of total population are men, 29,300 are women. More than  26,2 percent of the population (about 15,300 persons) consists of young people and teenagers aged 14–29.

Etymology 
Zardab is a Persian word (زردآب Zardab) meaning Yellow Water. There are several interpretations of the translation. Some interpret Yellow Water as "dirty water" referring to the dirty debris left after historic floods of the Kura River which goes through the Zardab raion. These floods do not take place any more since the construction of Mingachevir reservoir which prevented the Kura river from overflowing. Another version states the term "yellow" refers to the golden colour. That is, after the floods, the overflown river used to deliver the water necessary for arrogation, therefore making it as precious as gold. And finally, the third version states the reference is made to the second interpretation of the word "Zard" which also means "eatable bird" which in turn refers to the Zərd-əncirquşu birds which are in Zardab's habitat.

Notable natives 
 Hasan bey Zardabi, Azerbaijani publicist

References

External links

 Official web page of the Zardab raion

 
Districts of Azerbaijan